Indy NXT, previously Indy Lights, is an American developmental automobile racing series sanctioned by IndyCar, currently known as Firestone Indy NXT Series for sponsorship reasons. Indy Lights is the highest step on the Road to Indy, a program of racing series leading up to the IndyCar Series. The Indy Lights series has been promoted by Anderson Promotions since 2014, which also manages the Road to Indy program.

A similar series named Indy Lights filled the developmental role for the CART series, and ran from 1986 to 1993 as the American Racing Series and Dayton Indy Lights from 1991 to 2001. The current IndyCar sanctioned series was founded in 2002 as the Infiniti Pro Series as a way to introduce new talent to IndyCar, with the moniker Indy Lights returning in 2008 when CART and IndyCar unified. The Indy Lights champion was awarded a $1M scholarship toward the IndyCar Series, and guaranteed three races including the Indianapolis 500 during this time. For 2023, Penske Entertainment announced a rebranding to the name Indy NXT.

Early origins
In the post-WWII era, through the early 1960s, open wheel race cars were almost exclusively front-engined "roadsters". The primary ladder series included sprints and midgets. By the end of the 1960s, the cars evolved into rear-engine formula-style machines. Likewise, the feeder series began to follow the same mold. When USAC became the primary sanctioning body for top-level Indy car racing, the ladder of progression began to change.

USAC Mini Indy Series
The SCCA Super Vee and Formula Atlantic series were among the first formula-based ladder series. However, neither had any direct tie to USAC. In 1977, USAC started the "Mini-Indy" series, using Super Vee machines. The series ended after 1980 when USAC stopped sanctioning Indy car races outside of Indianapolis.

Following the end of the "Mini Indy" series, the driver pool in the early 1980s to CART and the Indy 500 was drawn in a somewhat unorganized fashion among Super Vees, Atlantics, SCCA, former Can-Am drivers, sprints, midgets, and even stock cars and off-road racing. In addition, a number of CART series drivers during the 1980s and early 1990s were former Formula 1 competitors, most of whom had climbed the European-based ladder series.

Original series (1986–2001)

The original Indy Lights series was an open-wheeled racing series that acted as a developmental circuit for CART from 1986 to 2001. It was founded in 1986 as the American Racing Series (ARS). The series was renamed Indy Lights in 1991. The CART-sanctioned series became widely popular and secured the title sponsorship of Firestone. Later, Firestone's subsidiary Dayton Tires took over as tire supplier and title sponsor.

A spec-series, CART Indy Lights used March chassis (essentially a modified 85B Formula 3000 chassis, renamed to Wildcat) from 1986 to 1992.  In 1992 Lola became the primary chassis constructor to the series, using a modified F3000 chassis.  In 1997, a newly updated and modern-looking chassis was introduced based on an F3000 design.  It would remain through 2001. Buick V6 engines were used for its entire existence.

The ARS/Indy Lights series' championship winners included two CART champions, two IndyCar Series champions, seven CCWS race-winners and two Formula One drivers.

The Indy Lights schedule closely followed that of the CART series, and typically had a gap of up to a month while the primary CART teams raced at the Indy 500. The races were usually held the morning of the CART series races, as an undercard event. In early years, the Indy Lights series skipped superspeedway races such as Michigan, but eventually found its way to race there. In some rare occasions, the Indy Lights ran at non-CART tracks, generally as a support race to a series other than CART. In 2001 Indy Lights ran at Road Atlanta the weekend of the Petit Le Mans, and ran at Kansas with the IRL.

By the late 1990s and early 2000s, CART was suffering from financial problems. Meanwhile, in 1996, the rival Indy Racing League was formed. CART canceled the minor league outright after the 2001 season. By this time, the Toyota Atlantic series was equally effective in providing CART with new drivers. In addition, the Atlantics served as a springboard for such drivers as Greg Ray, Sam Hornish Jr. and Richie Hearn to enter the IRL. The Atlantics effectively became CART's primary feeder system, and later became Champ Car World Series' official in-house feeder championship for a time.

Current series (2002–present)
The Infiniti Pro Series was re-founded by the Indy Racing League and began racing in 2002, the year after the CART-sanctioned Indy Lights series' demise. It was a spec series using a TWR (Tom Walkinshaw Racing) developed 3.5L version of the V8 engine used in the Infiniti Q45 combined with Dallara chassis producing . The series initially struggled to attract drivers and some races have had fewer than 10 entrants. However, with the introduction of a number of road-course races to the schedule in 2005, many of America's top prospects like Marco Andretti and Phil Giebler were attracted to the series to run part-time schedules on road courses. In 2006, a boost in prize money even further increased car counts to 16 or more, with an even six oval and six road course mix. The selected races being double races, and a stand-alone race (independent of the IndyCar Series) were scheduled on the USGP weekend.

The series was called the Menards Infiniti Pro Series (MIPS) until 2006 when both Menards and Nissan dropped their sponsorship of the series. It was then known as the Indy Pro Series. On March 26, 2008, the series announced a changing of names, when the historical records and proprietary information of Champ Car were acquired by the IRL. The series then became known as Firestone Indy Lights.

The centerpiece of the Indy Lights schedule is the Freedom 100, contested at Indianapolis Motor Speedway on the Friday prior to the Indianapolis 500. The series also held a support race for the U.S. Grand Prix, the Liberty Challenge, from 2005 to 2007. It was the series' only event that was not a support race to an IndyCar event.

In 2008, the margin was established by the Guinness Book of World Records as the closest finish ever in a car race.

On May 24, 2013, Peter Dempsey captured his first Indy Lights win in the Freedom 100 in the closest finish in Indianapolis Motor Speedway history (0.0026 secs) in a four-wide finish.

In June 2013, it was announced that the series would be promoted by Andersen Promotions beginning in 2014. with IndyCar sanctioning remaining. In August it was announced that Cooper Tire would replace Firestone as the official tire of the series in 2014. This resulted in all three levels of the Road to Indy leading up to the IndyCar Series being promoted by Andersen and feature Cooper tires, beginning in 2014. The Andersen team implemented a number of cost-reducing updates to the chassis and engine package in 2014 and introduced a new chassis and engine combination in 2015. On October 31, 2013, the series announced that Dallara would be the manufacturer of the fourth-generation Indy Lights chassis and it would be named the Dallara IL-15. On November 1, 2013 a new logo was unveiled for the Indy Lights series On November 26 it was announced that the engine for the new package would be a 2.0L turbocharged MZR-R four cylinder engine, tuned to last a full season of competition and producing 450 horsepower, with push-to-pass offering an additional 50 horsepower.

The 2020 season was canceled through a combination of low grid numbers and the COVID-19 pandemic.  

As of 2021, the Dallara IL-15 continues to be the chassis employed by the series, but engines are now provided by AER, Advanced Engines Research, modifying and tuning base 2.0 liter I-4 Mazda power plants turbocharged to provide the same power and push-to-pass capability of the former engines, with the added capability of longevity: the engines are designed and fabricated to run an entire season without a rebuild. A halo was added to the IL-15 for the 2021 season.

Andretti Autosport's Kyle Kirkwood captured the 2021 series championship, while HMD Motorsports' David Malukas finished second and Global Racing Group w/HMD Motorsports' Linus Lundqvist was third. HMD Motorsports/Global Racing Group secured their first Road to Indy team championship.

Firestone will return as the official tire supplier for the 2023 season.

Teams

Specifications

Specifications (2002–2014)

Engine displacement: Nissan/Infiniti built by Speedway Motors  DOHC V8
Gearbox: 6-speed sequential manual transmission
Weight:  on ovals;  on road/street courses
Power output: 
Fuel: Sunoco 100 RON unleaded
Fuel capacity: 
Fuel delivery: Fuel injection
Aspiration: Naturally aspirated
Length: 
Width: 
Wheelbase: 
Steering: Manual, rack and pinion

Specifications (2015–present)
Chassis manufacturer:Dallara IL-15
Engine displacement: Mazda-AER P63  DOHC inline-4
Gearbox: 6-speed sequential semi-automatic gearbox
Weight:  excluding driver and fuel
Power output:  push-to-pass
Fuel: VP Racing Fuels 101 RON unleaded
Fuel delivery: Direct fuel injection
Aspiration: Single-turbocharged
Length: 
Width: 
Wheelbase: Undisclosed
Steering: Manual, rack and pinion

Champions

USAC Mini-Indy Series

1977: Bagley and Johnson tied in the points and were declared co-champions.

Indy Lights

1 Chaves and  Jack Harvey (Schmidt Peterson Motorsports were tied in points and wins (4 each).  Chaves won the title based on more second-place finishes (5 vs 1).

Graduates

 Didier André
 Jeff Andretti
 Marco Andrettia
 Richard Antinucci
 Ian Ashley
 Oliver Askew
 Éric Bachelart
 Fabrizio Barbazza
 Dillon Battistini
 Ana Beatriz
 Jon Beekhuis
 Townsend Bell
 Billy Boata
 Brian Bonner
 Geoff Boss
 Claude Bourbonnais
 Matthew Brabham
 Steve Bren
 Jason Bright
 Robbie Buhla
 Buzz Calkinsa b
 Jaime Camara
 Juan Carlos Carbonell
 Ed Carpentera
 Patrick Carpentierd
 Hélio Castronevesa c d
 Alfonso Celis Jr.
 Gabby Chaves
 Ross Cheever
 P. J. Chesson
 Max Chilton
 Zachary Claman DeMelo
 Bryan Clauson
 Wade Cunningham
 Guido Daccò
 Wally Dallenbach Jr.
 Conor Daly
 Cristiano da Mattad e
 Paul Dana
 Airton Daréa
 James Davison
 Luis Díaz
 Mark Dismorea
 Scott Dixona b c d
 Mario Domínguezd
 Fredrik Ekblom
 RC Enerson
 Wim Eyckmans
 Juan Manuel Fangio II
 Adrián Fernándeza d
 Stan Fox
 A. J. Foyt IV
 Franck Fréon
 Luiz Garcia Jr.
 Affonso Giaffone
 Felipe Giaffonea
 Phil Giebler
 Jorge Goeters
 Marco Greco
 Michael Greenfield
 Mike Groff
 Robbie Groff
 Dean Hall
 Matt Halliday
 Scott Harrington
 Jack Harvey
 Naoki Hattori
 Shigeaki Hattori
 Jack Hawksworth
 Jon Herb
 Bryan Hertaa d
 Colton Hertaa
 J. R. Hildebrand
 James Hinchcliffea
 Jay Howard
 Ken Johnson
 Davy Jones
 Ed Jones
 P. J. Jones
 Niclas Jönsson
 Kyle Kaiser
 Tony Kanaana b c d
 Sage Karam
 Dalton Kellett
 Charlie Kimballa
 Kyle Kirkwood
 David Kudrave
 Rodolfo Lavín
 Eddie Lawson
 Jaques Laziera
 Matheus Leist
 Alex Lloyd
 Arie Luyendyk Jr.
 David Malukas
 Pippa Mann
 Raphael Matos
 Hiro Matsushita
 Casey Mears
 Thiago Medeiros
 Chris Menninga
 Dr. Jack Miller
 Greg Moored
 Carlos Muñoza
 Brad Murphey
 Hideki Mutoh
 Josef Newgardena b
 Hideki Noda
 Ryan Norman
 Johnny O'Connell
 Patricio O'Warda
 Benjamin Pedersen
 Franck Perera
 Spencer Pigot
 Martin Plowman
 Ted Prappas
 Graham Rahala
 Greg Raya b
 Tony Renna
 André Ribeirod
 Sting Ray Robb
 Billy Roe
 Mario Romancini
 Felix Rosenqvista
 Marty Roth
 Sebastián Saavedra
 Gualter Salles
 Vinicio Salmi
 Franco Scapini
 Oriol Serviàd
 Jeff Simmons
 Guy Smith
 Mark Smith
 Sammy Swindell
 Mark Taylor
 Didier Theys
 Brian Till
 Paul Tracyd e
 Robby Unser
 Jimmy Vasserd e
 Tristan Vautier
 Zach Veach
 Rinus Veekaya
 Jeff Warda
 Dan Wheldona b c
 Stefan Wilson
 Cory Witherill

a denotes driver who has won an IndyCar Series event.
b denotes driver who has won an IndyCar Series championship.
c denotes driver who has won an Indianapolis 500.
d denotes driver who has won a CART/Champ Car event.
e denotes driver who has won a CART/Champ Car World Series championship.

See also
IndyCar
Firestone Freedom 100
FIA Formula 2
Super Formula Lights
Super2 Series
DTM Trophy
FIA Formula 3

References

External links

 
Auto racing series in Canada
Auto racing series in the United States
One-make series
Recurring sporting events established in 1986
Formula racing series
Road to Indy
Indy Pro Series